Munkip (Mungkip) is a nearly extinct Finisterre languages of Papua New Guinea. It is spoken in Kasuka and Mungkip villages of Sintogora ward, Wain-Erap Rural LLG.

References

Finisterre languages
Languages of Morobe Province
Endangered Papuan languages